Duarte High School is a public high school located in Duarte, California and is part of Duarte Unified School District. Duarte High School currently has 950 students enrolled. Their mascot is the falcon. It was recognized as a California Distinguished School in 2007 for its high test scores and academic achievement.

Duarte High was recognized in Newsweek as one of the top public high schools in the United States. See below for detailed rankings.

School information
 Duarte School first opened in 1909 in the old schoolhouse that is now The Old Spaghetti Factory.  Duarte High School opened in 1958. Prior to that time Duarte high school students attended Monrovia High School. (The Wildcats.)
 Duarte High School is a part of the Montview league. In 2010 Duarte implemented academies, allowing students to take classes that are aimed to focus on their interests. In addition, these academies allow the students to share similar classes with those students in the same academy. The goal of implementing academies is to prepare students for advanced education as well as furthering their knowledge in a desired field.
 Current Administration: Luis Haro (Principal)
Duarte High School, although a small, highlights the achievements of all students of different backgrounds. Some programs that are recognized are community servic clubs, advanced placement, the Early College Program, and various sports on the varsity level. Well, unless those sports are girls sports. Girls sports often goes underappreciated by most members of faculty and students. But that doesn't suprise anyone, does it?

Athletics
 1975 Duarte High School won the Rio Hondo League wrestling championship. The last year they did so, ending a four year streak.
 1985 Duarte High School won the CIF Title in the 4x100 Relay, Sophomore Martin Cannady wins 100 Meters @ 10.70 and placed second 200 meters @ 21.63
 1986 Duarte High School won the CIF title in the 4x100 Relay, 4x400 Relay, 100 Meters, 200 meters, 400 meters
 1986 Duarte High School won the Southern California Masters Meet 4x100 relay and Runner-up in the 4x400. 
 1987 Duarte High School won the 3A CIF Track and Field Title. Winning the 4x100 meter relay, 100 meters, 200 meters. 
1992 Duarte High School Football team reaches CIF Championship game for 1st time in school history.
 On April 26, 2013, Duarte High's Boys' Tennis ends the tennis season as the undefeated team of Montview League, led by first season head coach Byron Leung.
November 2014, Duarte High School's Girl's Volleyball team reaches CIF Div. 4A championship for first time in school history. 
November 2015, Duarte High School's Girls' Volleyball team reaches CIF Div. 4A championship game for second year in a row.
 April 30, 2015, Duarte High's Boys' Tennis team finishes as undefeated League Champions for their third consecutive year.
 In 2016, basketball's Lady Falcons reaches CIF Div. 4A championship game, making it the first time in Duarte High School history for its girls' basketball team to reach a CIF final.
In 2018, boys basketball became the first program in school history to win a CIF championship.
In 2022, Girls softball reached the CIF Div. XII semi-finals, 1st softball team to go beyond 2nd round in school history.

Notable alumni
 Dennis Weathersby, NFL Player
 Nate Jacquet, NFL player
 Daimon Shelton, NFL player
 Greg Ainsworth, NFL player, 2 time NBA All Star, drafted by the Dodgers
 Carlos Fisher, MLB player
 Charles Pauley, NFL player
 Cary-Hiroyuki Tagawa, Japanese-American Actor
 Mike Harris, NFL player 
 Sam Shepard, American playwright, actor, and television and film director

Newsweek rankings
The table below shows the rankings that Duarte High School received since being recognized as Newsweek's America's Top Public Schools in 2006.
 2008 - #1264
 2007 - #1286
 2006 - #1115

References

External links
 Duarte High School Architects
 Duarte High School website
 Satellite Imagery of Duarte High

High schools in Los Angeles County, California
Duarte, California
Public high schools in California
1909 establishments in California
Educational institutions established in 1909